Handebol Clube Taubaté  is a handball club from Taubaté, Brazil. Currently, they compete in the Brazilian National League and it is the current vice champion.

Accomplishments
São Paulo State Championship: 5
2015, 2018, 2019, 2020,2021
Brazilian National League: 7
2013, 2014, 2016, 2019, 2020, 2021, 2022
 Runners-up: 3
2015, 2017, 2018
Pan American Men's Club Handball Championship: 5
2013, 2014, 2015, 2016, 2018
South and Central American Men's Club Handball Championship: 2
2019, 2022
Participantions in the IHF Super Globe:
2013: 6th
2014: 6th
2015: 6th
2016: 7th
2018: 5th
2019: 6th
2022: 8th

Team

Current squad
Squad for the 2022 IHF Super Globe

  Maik Santos
  Washington Luiz Santos
  Vinicius de Castro
  João Felipe Rodrigues
  Luiz André Saboia
  Fábio Sozzi Guimarães
  Cléber Andrade
  Pedro Augusto Telles
  Leandro Silva
  Mikael Cândido
  Felipe Roberto Braz
  Vinícius Teixeira
  Matheus Perrella
  Ronaldo Catarino
  João Henrique Rodrigues
  Gustavo de Andrade

References

External links
Handebol Taubaté Official Website

Brazilian handball clubs
Handball in Brazil
Sports teams in São Paulo (state)